The Copa Digeder 1989 was the 19th edition of the Chilean Cup tournament. The competition started on March 4, 1989 and concluded on July 9, 1989. first and second level teams took part in the tournament. Colo-Colo won the competition for their seventh time, beating Universidad Católica 1–0 in the final.  The points system in the first round awarded 3 points for a win. In the event of a tie, each team was awarded 1 point, and an additional point was awarded to the winner of a penalty shoot-out.

Calendar

Group Round

Group A

Group B

Group C

Group D

Quarterfinals

Semifinals

Final

Lineups in the Final

 Colo-Colo:
 Daniel Morón; Juan Carlos Peralta, Miguel Ramírez, Lizardo Garrido, Alfonso Neculñir, Hugo Bello, Juan Soto, Sergio Díaz, Marcelo Barticciotto, Ricardo Dabrowski, Sergio Salgado (75' Javier Margas).
 DT: Arturo Salah.
 ----------------------------------------------------------------------------------------------
 Universidad Católica:
 Patricio Toledo; Andrés Romero, Luis Abarca, Pablo Yoma, Carlos Soto, Francisco Hórmann (58' Andrés Olivares), Fabián Estay, Nelson Parraguez, Gerardo Reinoso, Luis Pérez, Rodrigo Barrera (72' Raimundo Tupper).
 DT: Ignacio Prieto.

Top goalscorer
Eric Lecaros (Deportes Valdivia) 16 goals

See also
 1989 Campeonato Nacional
 1989 Copa Invierno
 Segunda División

References
Revista Minuto 90, (Santiago, Chile) March–July 1989 (scores & information)
Revista Triunfo, (Santiago, Chile) March–July 1989 (scores & information)

Copa Chile
Chile
1989